Annie Svedin (born 12 October 1991) is a Swedish ice hockey player for IF Sundsvall Hockey and the Swedish national team. She participated at the 2015 IIHF Women's World Championship.

References

External links

1991 births
Living people
Swedish women's ice hockey defencemen
Ohio State Buckeyes women's ice hockey players
Swedish expatriate ice hockey players in the United States
People from Sundsvall
Olympic ice hockey players of Sweden
Ice hockey players at the 2018 Winter Olympics
Sportspeople from Västernorrland County